Footwork refers to dance technique aspects related to feet: foot position and foot action.

The following aspects of footwork may be considered:
Dance technique: a proper footwork may be vital for proper posture and movement of a dancer.
Aesthetic value: some foot positions and actions are traditionally considered appealing, while other ones are ugly, although this depends on the culture.
Artistic expression: a sophisticated footwork may in itself be the goal of the dance expression.

Different dances place different emphasis on the above aspects.

Ballet 
There are five basic dance positions that are necessary to dance ballet. Each dance move in ballet starts and ends in one of the five positions.

 First Position- The back of the heels touch while the balls of the feet are facing outwards, completely.
 Second Position- The same as first position but with the length of a foot in between the heels.
 Third Position- Start off in second position and slide on foot back so that the arch of one foot is touching the heel of the other.
 Fourth Position- The same as third position but with the heel of one foot at the level of the toes on the other, instead of at the arch, and a foot apart.
 Fifth Position- Similar to fourth position but with the toes of each foot touching the heel of the other foot. Complete contact, if possible.

Ballroom
In a narrow sense, e.g., in descriptions of ballroom dance figures, the term refers to the behavior of the foot when it meets the floor. In particular, it describes which part of the foot is in contact with the floor: ball, heel, flat, toe, high toe, inside/outside edge, etc.

Breaking
In breakdance, moves performed on one's hands and feet may be referred to as downrock or (especially in the southern United States) as footwork.  Typical moves in this type of dance include the "1-step", "2-steps", "3-steps", "4-steps", "5-steps", "6-steps", "coffee grinders", "Valdez", "C-C's", and "front C-C's". Additionally in breakdancing there exists moves specifically known as footwork which place emphasis on one's foot movement. Examples of such moves include the Indian step, Salsa step, and Crossovers.

Hip Hop 
The two basic movements in hip hop are popping and locking. It's the way in which you move your legs, arms, and torso by contracting and relaxing those muscles. When the dancer flexes, pauses, and stays in the same position, that is considered "locking". When the dancer quickly locks into another position, after the pause of locking, that is considered "popping".

Jazz 
Balance and grace are key components to be proficient in jazz. The dancers, usually, have a strong background in knowing how to dance ballet for that reason. Jazz consists of many walks, turns, and jumps. Personality is shown through the dance as they add a touch to each step. Instead of stopping and balancing in positions, jazz dancers move through them -- suspension.

Latin 
Bachata- Three steps to one side, pause, three steps to the other side, pause. This is practiced in a four-beat pattern.

Cha Cha Cha- The basic movement of taking a step to the front or back then three quick steps between feet.

Mambo- Shifting weight between feet while moving towards the front and then back. Three-beat step.

Merengue- Step left and right while moving hips when shifting the weight.

Salsa- Two quick steps followed by a pause or slow step. Turns are usually added for fun.

See also
Glossary of partner dance terms
Glossary of ballet terms
Rises and falls

References

Dance moves